Lumachan is a railway station on the Alishan Forest Railway line located in Zhuqi Township, Chiayi County, Taiwan.

History
The station building was originally constructed in 1910 during the Japanese rule. The service stopped in November 1982 after the opening of Provincial Highway 18. As the tourism activities in the area started to grow in the 2000s, the station was restored in December 2004. The station master quarter was restored in April 2006.

Architecture
The station is located 82 meters above sea level.

Around the station
 Renyitan Dam

See also
 List of railway stations in Taiwan

References

1910 establishments in Taiwan
Alishan Forest Railway stations
Railway stations in Chiayi County
Railway stations opened in 1910